Everywhere (stylized EVERYWHERƎ) is an upcoming video game developed by Build a Rocket Boy.

Gameplay 
Multiple narratives will be presented for players to choose from. It is set in an open world environment, and will feature seamless cooperative multiplayer.

Development 
Conceptualized in 2016, the game started development on Amazon Lumberyard with a team of three ex-Rockstar North employees—Leslie Benzies, Matthew Smith and Colin Entwistle—numbering about thirty staff by January 2017. Royal Circus Games (renamed in October 2018 Build a Rocket Boy), is developing Everywhere from studios based in Edinburgh, Budapest and Los Angeles, with the intention of offering a less restrictive experience than that of other games. It draws most of its influences from real life, according to Benzies. Staff worked from home during the COVID-19 pandemic. 

In November 2020, the studio announced that it had moved development to the Unreal Engine.

In August 2022, a teaser trailer was shown at Gamescom 2022. The game is set to be released in 2023.

Notes

References

External links 
 

Upcoming video games scheduled for 2023
Multiplayer and single-player video games
Open-world video games
Unreal Engine games
Video games developed in Hungary
Video games developed in the United Kingdom
Video games developed in the United States